Kashubian or Cassubian (Kashubian:) is a West Slavic language belonging to the Lechitic subgroup along with Polish and Silesian. Although often classified as a language in its own right, it is sometimes viewed as a dialect of Pomeranian or as a dialect of Polish.

In Poland, it has been an officially recognized ethnic-minority language since 2005. Approximately 108,000 people use mainly Kashubian at home. It is the only remnant of the Pomeranian language. It is close to standard Polish with influence from Low German and the extinct Polabian (West Slavic) and Old Prussian (West Baltic) languages.

The Kashubian language exists in two different forms: vernacular dialects used in rural areas, and literary variants used in education.

Origin
Kashubian is assumed to have evolved from the language spoken by some tribes of Pomeranians called Kashubians, in the region of Pomerania, on the southern coast of the Baltic Sea between the Vistula and Oder rivers. The Pomeranians were said to have arrived before the Poles, and certain tribes managed to maintain their language and traditions despite German and Polish settlements. It first began to evolve separately in the period from the thirteenth to the fifteenth century as the Polish-Pomeranian linguistic area began to divide based around important linguistic developments centred in the western (Kashubian) part of the area.

In the 19th century, Florian Ceynowa became Kashubian's first known activist. He undertook tremendous efforts to awaken Kashubian self-identity through the establishment of Kashubian language, customs, and traditions. He felt strongly that Poles were born brothers and that Kashubia was a separate nation.

The Young Kashubian movement followed in 1912, led by author and doctor Aleksander Majkowski, who wrote for the paper "Zrzësz Kaszëbskô" as part of the "Zrzëszincë" group. The group contributed significantly to the development of the Kashubian literary language.

The earliest printed documents in Polish with Kashubian elements date from the end of the 16th century. The modern orthography was first proposed in 1879.

Related languages
Many scholars and linguists debate whether Kashubian should be recognized as a Polish dialect or separate language. From the diachronic view it is a distinct Lechitic West Slavic language, but from the synchronic point of view it is a Polish dialect. Kashubian is closely related to Slovincian, while both of them are dialects of Pomeranian. Many linguists, in Poland and elsewhere, consider it a divergent dialect of Polish. Dialectal diversity is so great within Kashubian that a speaker of southern dialects has considerable difficulty in understanding a speaker of northern dialects. The spelling and the grammar of Polish words written in Kashubian, which is most of its vocabulary, is highly unusual, making it difficult for native Polish speakers to comprehend written text in Kashubian.

Like Polish, Kashubian includes about 5% loanwords from German (such as  "art"). Unlike Polish, these are mostly from Low German and only occasionally from High German. Other sources of loanwords include the Baltic languages.

Speakers

Poland
The number of speakers of Kashubian varies widely from source to source, ranging from as low as 4,500 to the upper 366,000. In the 2011 census, over 108,000 people in Poland declared that they mainly use Kashubian at home, of these only 10 percent consider Kashubian to be their mother tongue, with the rest considering themselves to be native speakers of both Kashubian and Polish. The number of people who can speak at least some Kashubian is higher, around 366,000. All Kashubian speakers are also fluent in Polish. A number of schools in Poland use Kashubian as a teaching language. It is an official alternative language for local administration purposes in Gmina Sierakowice, Gmina Linia, Gmina Parchowo, Gmina Luzino and Gmina Żukowo in the Pomeranian Voivodeship. Most respondents say that Kashubian is used in informal speech among family members and friends. This is most likely because Polish is the official language and spoken in formal settings.

Americas
During the Kashubian diaspora of 1855–1900, 115,700 Kashubians emigrated to North America, with around 15,000 emigrating to Brazil. Among the Polish community of Renfrew County, Ontario, Kashubian is widely spoken to this day, despite the use of more formal Polish by parish priests. In Winona, Minnesota, which Ramułt termed the "Kashubian Capital of America", Kashubian was regarded as "poor Polish," as opposed to the "good Polish" of the parish priests and teaching sisters. Consequently, Kashubian failed to survive Polonization and died out shortly after the mid-20th century.

Literature

Important for Kashubian literature was Xążeczka dlo Kaszebov by Florian Ceynowa (1817–1881). Hieronim Derdowski (1852–1902 in Winona, Minnesota) was another significant author who wrote in Kashubian, as was Aleksander Majkowski (1876–1938) from Kościerzyna, who wrote the Kashubian national epic The Life and Adventures of Remus. Jan Trepczyk was a poet who wrote in Kashubian, as was Stanisław Pestka. Kashubian literature has been translated into Czech, Polish, English, German, Belarusian, Slovene and Finnish. Aleksander Majkowski and Alojzy Nagel belong to the most commonly translated Kashubian authors of the 20th century. A considerable body of Christian literature has been translated into Kashubian, including the New Testament, much of it by Adam Ryszard Sikora (OFM). Franciszek Grucza graduated from a Catholic seminary in Pelplin. He was the first priest to introduce Catholic liturgy in Kashubian.

Works 
The earliest recorded artifacts of Kashubian date back to the 15th century and include a book of spiritual psalms that were used to introduce Kashubian to the Lutheran church: 
 1586  Duchowne piesnie (Spiritual songs) D. Marcina Luthera y ynßich naboznich męzow. Zniemieckiego w Slawięsky ięzik wilozone Przes Szymana Krofea... w Gdainsku: przes Jacuba Rhode, Tetzner 1896: translated from pastorks. S. Krofeja, Słowińca (?) rodem z Dąbia. 
The next few texts are also religious catechisms but this time from the Catholic Church, because the majority of Kashubians were Roman Catholic and these texts helped them become more unified in faith:
 1643 Mały Catechism (Little Catechism) D. Marciná Lutherá Niemiecko-Wándalski ábo Slowięski to jestá z Niemieckiego języká w Słowięski wystáwiony na jáwnosc wydan..., w Gdaińsku przes Jerzego Rhetá, Gdansk 1643. Pastor smołdziński ks. Mostnik, rodem ze Slupska.
 Perykopy smołdzinskie (Smoldzinski Pericope), published by Friedhelm Hinze, Berlin (East), 1967
 Śpiewnik starokaszubski (Old Kashubian songbook), published by Friedhelm Hinze, Berlin (East), 1967

Education
Throughout the communist period in Poland (1948-1989), Kashubian greatly suffered in education and social status. Kashubian was represented as folklore and prevented from being taught in schools. Following the collapse of communism, attitudes on the status of Kashubian have been gradually changing. It has been included in the program of school education in Kashubia although not as a language of teaching or as a required subject for every child, but as a foreign language taught 3 hours per week at parents' explicit request. Since 1991, it is estimated that there have been around 17,000 students in over 400 schools who have learned Kashubian. Kashubian has some limited usage on public radio and had on public television. Since 2005, Kashubian has enjoyed legal protection in Poland as an official regional language. It is the only language in Poland with that status, which was granted by the Act of 6 January 2005 on National and Ethnic Minorities and on the Regional Language of the Polish Parliament. The act provides for its use in official contexts in ten communes in which speakers are at least 20% of the population. The recognition means that heavily populated Kashubian localities have been able to have road signs and other amenities with Polish and Kashubian translations on them.

Dialects

Friedrich Lorentz wrote in the early 20th century that there were three main Kashubian dialects. These include the
 Northern Kashubian dialect 
 Middle Kashubian dialect
 Southern Kashubian dialect

Other researches would argue that each tiny region of the Kaszuby has its own dialect, as in Dialects and Slang of Poland: 
 Bylacki dialect
 Slowinski dialect 
 Kabatkow dialect
 Zaborski dialect 
 Tucholski and Krajniacki dialect (although both dialects would be considered a transitional form of the Wielkopolski dialect and are included as official Wielkopolskie dialects)

Features
A "standard" Kashubian language does not exist despite several attempts to create one; rather a diverse range of dialects takes its place. The vocabulary is heavily influenced by German and Polish and uses the Latin alphabet.

There are several similarities between Kashubian and Polish. For some linguists they consider this a sign that Kashubian is a dialect of Polish but others believe that this is just a sign that the two originate from the same location. They are nevertheless related to a certain degree and their proximity has made Kashubian influenced by Polish and its various dialects.

Exemplary differences between Kashubian and Polish:
 a consonant-softening outcome of Proto-Slavic soft syllabic r in northern Kashubian dialects: ex: Northern Kashubian: , ; Polish: , 
 vowel  takes the place of former long , continuants of the old long a distinct from the old short a are present in most dialects of Polish but absent from the standard language

Phonology and morphology
They follow the Clements and Hume (1995) constriction model, where sounds are represented in terms of constriction. They are then organized according to particular features like anterior, implying the activation of features dominating it. The vocalic place node would be placed under the C-place node and V-place nodes interpolated to preserve well-forwardness.

Vowels

 The exact phonetic realization of the close-mid vowels  depends on the dialect.
 Apart from these, there are also nasal vowels . Their exact phonetic realization depends on the dialect.

Consonants
Kashubian has simple consonants with a secondary articulation along with complex ones with secondary articulation.

  are palato-alveolar.
  are alveolo-palatal; the last four appear only in some dialects.
 The fricative trill  is now used only by some northern and northeastern speakers; other speakers realize it as flat postalveolar .
 The labialized velar central approximant  is realized as a velarized denti-alveolar lateral approximant  by older speakers of southeastern dialects.

Stress 
Among people who speak the northern dialects (including the extinct Slovincian dialect), the stress is free and partially mobile. Linguistic research on northern dialects is important for the reconstruction of the original stress in the Proto-Slavic language.

A free, immobile stress is representative for central dialects.

Speakers of southern dialects have a fixed initial accent (as in the Podhale Goral dialect).

Orthography

Kashubian alphabet

The following digraphs and trigraphs are used:

Sample text 
Article 1 of the Universal Declaration of Human Rights in Kashubian:

Wszëtczi lëdze rodzą sã wòlny ë równy w swòji czëstnoce ë swòjich prawach. Mają òni dostóne rozëm ë sëmienié ë nôlégô jima pòstãpòwac wobec drëdzich w dëchù bracënotë. 
Article 1 of the Universal Declaration of Human Rights in English:
All human beings are born free and equal in dignity and rights. They are endowed with reason and conscience and should act towards one another in a spirit of brotherhood.

Gallery

See also 

 Ł–l merger
 Bilingual communes in Poland
 Gdańsk Pomerania
 Kashubia
 Kashubian alphabet
 Kashubian-Pomeranian Association
 Kashubian studies
 Masurian dialect
 Old Prussian language
 Pomerelia
 Pomeranian language

Notes

References 
 Comrie, Bernard; Corbett, Greville. G. (2002). The Slavonic Languages. London: Routledge. 
 Blank, Joshua C. Creating Kashubia: History, Memory and Identity in Canada's First Polish Community. Montreal and Kingston: McGill-Queen's University Press, 2016.
 Gyula Décsy, Die linguistische Struktur Europas, Vergangenheit — Gegenwart — Zukunft, Otto Harrassowitz, Wiesbaden 1973
 Friedhelm Hinze, Wörterbuch und Lautlehre der deutschen Lehnwörter im Pomoranischen (Kaschubischen), Berlin 1965
 Język kaszubski. Poradnik encyklopedyczny. ed. J. Treder, Rev. 2. corrected and expanded UG, Oficyna Czec, Gdańsk, 2006
 J. Borzyszkowski, J. Mordawski, J. Treder: Historia, geografia, język i piśmiennictwo Kaszubów; J. Bòrzëszkòwsczi, J. Mòrdawsczi, J. Tréder: Historia, geògrafia, jãzëk i pismienizna Kaszëbów, Wëdowizna M. Rôżok przë wespółrobòce z Institutã Kaszëbsczim, Gduńsk 1999, p. 128
 Aleksander Labuda, Słowôrz kaszëbsko-polsczi. Słownik polsko-kaszubski, Gdańsk 1982
 Friedrich Lorentz, Geschichte der Pomoranischen (Kaschubischen) Sprache, Berlin and Leipzig, 1925
 Nestor, N. & Hickey, T. (2009). Out of the Communist frying pan and into the EU fire? Exploring the case of Kashubian  .
 Nomachi Motoki, On the recipient passive in the Kashubian Language: Annex to Milka Ivić's syntactic inventory for Slavonic dialectology 
 Stefan Ramułt, Słownik języka pomorskiego, czyli kaszubskiego, Kraków, 1893 i.e. "Dictionary of the Pomeranian (Seacoast) or Kashubian language" (Kraków, 1893)
 Stefan Ramułt, Słownik języka pomorskiego czyli kaszubskiego. Scalił i znormalizował Jerzy Treder, Gdańsk, 2003
 C. F. i F. N. Voegelin, Classification and Index of the World's Languages. Elsevier, New York 1977

Further reading 

 Ager, S. (1998-2016). Kashubian (kaszëbsczi jãzëk). Retrieved February 12, 2016, from http://www.omniglot.com/writing/kashubian.htm
 Blank, Joshua C. Creating Kashubia: History, Memory and Identity in Canada's First Polish Community. Montreal and Kingston: McGill-Queen's University Press, 2016. 
 Grabowska A., Ladykowski P.. "The Change of the Cashubian Identity before Entering the EU". In: Baltic Journal of European Studies 2002, no. 1.
 
 
 
 W. (2016). Krótka historia języka kaszubskiego (Short History of the Kashubian Language). Retrieved February 12, 2016, from http://www.kaszubi.pl/o/reda/artykulmenu?id=395 
 Stanulewicz, D. (n.d.). The Use of the Kashubian Language from the Perspective of Young People Aged 16–19: Settings and Participants. 191–203. Retrieved February 12, 2016, from www.wilkuer.de/forschung/191-204_stanulewicz_final_js_wk_js.rtf.
 
 Szulest, David (2012). Kashubian Identity. Kashubs in Canada and Kashubia/Kaszebe Retrieved from http://kaszebsko.com/uploads/KASHUBIAN%20IDENTITY.pdf
 Toops, G. H. (2007). [Review of Das Kaschubische: Sprachtod oder Revitalisierung? Empirische Studien zur ethnolinguistischen Vitalität einer Sprachminderheit in Polen. Slavistische Beiträge, 452].Canadian Slavonic Papers, 49(1/2), 160–162.
 Topolinska, Z. (1974). A Historical Phonology of the Kashubian Dialects of Polish. General Information on the Kashubians and Kashubian Dialects. Retrieved from Google Books.

External links 

 
 LC
 The World Atlas of Language Structures - WALS
 BnF
 Omniglot
 COE 2011
 Kashubian language
 UNESCO
 Following the trail of manor houses and castles of the Northern Kashubian Region
 Kashubian resources; include phrasebooks
 dictionary
 Endangered languages
 Kaszëbskô Mowa: Freeing the Kashubian Language

 
Languages of Poland
Endangered Slavic languages
Slavic languages written in Latin script